The 2023 Detroit Tigers season will be the team's 123rd season and its 24th at Comerica Park. This will be the Tigers' third season under manager A. J. Hinch. The season will begin on the road against the Tampa Bay Rays on March 30, and the Tigers' home opener is against the Boston Red Sox on April 6.

Roster moves

Coaching staff
On October 7, 2022, the Tigers fired hitting coach Scott Coolbaugh and quality-control coach Josh Paul. Third-base coach Ramon Santiago and assistant hitting coach Mike Hessman were reassigned and offered minor-league coaching positions.
On November 15, 2022, the Tigers hired Michael Brdar and Keith Beauregard as hitting coaches. They also hired James Rowson as assistant hitting coach and Robin Lund as assistant pitching coach.

Trades 
On December 7, 2022, the Tigers traded pitcher Joe Jiménez to the Atlanta Braves in exchange for third baseman Justyn-Henry Malloy and pitcher Jake Higginbotham.
On December 31, 2022, the Tigers acquired infielder Tyler Nevin from the Baltimore Orioles in exchange for cash considerations.
On January 3, 2023, the Tigers traded outfielder Bligh Madris to the Houston Astros in exchange for cash considerations after previously claiming him off waivers and then designating him for assignment.
On January 7, 2023, the Tigers traded pitcher Gregory Soto and infielder Kody Clemens to the Philadelphia Phillies in exchange for outfielder Matt Vierling, infielder Nick Maton and catcher Donny Sands.

Releases 
On October 10, 2022, pitcher Drew Carlton elected free agency. On December 10, he signed a minor league contract with the San Diego Padres.
On October 13, 2022, pitcher Drew Hutchison elected free agency after being designated for assignment and clearing waivers. On January 6, 2023, Hutchison signed a minor-league contract with the Toronto Blue Jays.
On October 18, 2022, minor-league catcher Ali Sanchez was claimed off waivers by the Pittsburgh Pirates after being designated for assignment.
On November 6, 2022, relief pitcher Andrew Chafin opted out of the second year of his two-year contract with Detroit, making him a free agent. On the same day, relief pitcher Daniel Norris and catcher Tucker Barnhart also elected free agency. On December 29, Barnhart signed a two-year contract with the Chicago Cubs. On February 15, Chafin signed a one-year deal with the Arizona Diamondbacks and Norris signed a minor league contract with the Cincinnati Reds.
On November 9, 2022, outfielder Daz Cameron was claimed off waivers by the Baltimore Orioles. Third-baseman Josh Lester cleared waivers and was outrighted to the Toledo Mud Hens but chose to elect free agency. On December 6, Lester signed a minor-league contract with the Orioles.

On November 10, 2022, the Tigers outrighted shortstops Luis García and Jermaine Palacios, outfielder Víctor Reyes and  pitchers Bryan Garcia, Elvin Rodríguez and Luis Castillo to their triple-A affiliate, the Toledo Mud Hens. Aside from Luis Garcia, all of the players elected free agency after rejecting the outright assignment. On December 12, Reyes signed a minor-league contract with the Chicago White Sox. On December 16, 2022, Castillo signed with the Chiba Lotte Marines of Nippon Professional Baseball. On January 19, 2023, Rodriguez signed a minor league contract with the Tampa Bay Rays. On February 7, 2023, Bryan Garcia signed a minor league contract with the Houston Astros.
On November 15, 2022, the Tigers outrighted pitcher Sean Guenther to Toledo after being designated for assignment. The Tigers also designated pitchers Miguel Diaz and Kyle Funkhouser for assignment along with infielder Brendon Davis and catcher Michael Papierski. On January 17, 2023, Funkhouser signed a minor league deal with the Texas Rangers.
On November 18, 2022, the Tigers did not tender contracts to infielders Jeimer Candelario, Willi Castro and Harold Castro, all of whom became free agents. They also non-tendered designated players Diaz, Funkhouser, Davis and Papierski. On November 29. Candelario signed a one-year contract with the Washington Nationals. On December 30, Willi Castro signed a minor-league deal with the Minnesota Twins. On January 19, 2023, Harold Castro signed a minor league contract with the Colorado Rockies.
On December 23, 2022, the Tigers designated Ángel De Jesús for assignment. He was outrighted to the Toledo Mud Hens after clearing waivers on January 6, 2023.

Signings
On November 2, 2022, the Tigers claimed relief pitcher Sean Guenther off waivers from the Miami Marlins. He sat out the entire 2022 season after having Tommy John surgery. He was outrighted to the Toledo Mud Hens after clearing waivers on November 15, 2022.
On November 10, 2022, the Tigers claimed infielder Andy Ibanez off waivers from the Texas Rangers. He was outrighted to the Toledo Mud Hens after clearing waivers on January 6, 2023.
On November 18, 2022, the Tigers claimed outfielder Bligh Madris off waivers from the Tampa Bay Rays.  Madris was designated for assignment on December 21 and ultimately traded away on January 3, 2023.
On November 18, 2022, the Tigers and pitcher Tyler Alexander agreed on a one-year, $1.875 million contract, avoiding arbitration. 
On November 21, 2022, the Tigers re-signed recently non-tendered players Davis, Papierski, Diaz and Palacios to minor-league contracts.
On November 25, 2022, the Tigers and outfielder Austin Meadows agreed on a one-year, $4.3 million contract, avoiding arbitration.
On December 14, 2022, the Tigers signed pitcher Matthew Boyd to a one-year, $10 million contract. 
On December 14, 2022, the Tigers signed pitcher Michael Lorenzen to a one-year, $8.5 million contract.
On December 21, 2022, the Tigers claimed catcher Mario Feliciano off waivers from the Milwaukee Brewers. He was outrighted to the Toledo Mud Hens after clearing waivers on January 6, 2023.
On December 23, 2022, the Tigers claimed pitcher Zach Logue off waivers from the Oakland Athletics. Logue was designated for assignment on December 31. He was outrighted to the Toledo Mud Hens after clearing waivers on January 6, 2023.
On January 11, 2023, the Tigers claimed pitcher Edwin Uceta off waivers from the Arizona Diamondbacks.
On January 13, 2023, the Tigers agreed to a one-year, $2.2875 million contract with pitcher José Cisnero, avoiding arbitration.
On January 15, 2023, the Tigers signed pitcher Trey Wingenter to a minor league contract with an invitation to spring training.
On January 30, 2023, the Tigers signed outfielder Jonathan Davis to a minor league contract with an invitation to spring training.
On February 15, 2023, the Tigers signed pitcher Jace Fry to a minor league contract.
On February 17, 2023, the Tigers claimed pitcher Tyler Holton off waivers from the Arizona Diamondbacks.
On March 14, 2023, the Tigers claimed pitcher Freddy Pacheco off waivers from the St. Louis Cardinals. He was optioned to AAA Toledo, and invited to major league spring training.

Game log

|-
| 1 || March 30 || @ Rays ||  ||  ||  ||  ||  ||  || 
|-
| 2 || April 1 || @ Rays ||  ||  ||  ||  ||  ||  || 
|-
| 3 || April 2 || @ Rays ||  ||  ||  ||  ||  ||  || 
|-
| 4 || April 3 || @ Astros ||  ||  ||  ||  ||  ||  || 
|-
| 5 || April 4 || @ Astros ||  ||  ||  ||  ||  ||  || 
|-
| 6 || April 5 || @ Astros ||  ||  ||  ||  ||  ||  || 
|-
| 7 || April 6 || Red Sox ||  ||  ||  ||  ||  ||  || 
|-
| 8 || April 8 || Red Sox ||  ||  ||  ||  ||  ||  || 
|-
| 9 || April 9 || Red Sox ||  ||  ||  ||  ||  ||  || 
|-
| 10 || April 11 || @ Blue Jays ||  ||  ||  ||  ||  ||  || 
|-
| 11 || April 12 || @ Blue Jays ||  ||  ||  ||  ||  ||  || 
|-
| 12 || April 13 || @ Blue Jays ||  ||  ||  ||  ||  ||  || 
|-
| 13 || April 14 || Giants ||  ||  ||  ||  ||  ||  || 
|-
| 14 || April 15 || Giants ||  ||  ||  ||  ||  ||  || 
|-
| 15 || April 16 || Giants ||  ||  ||  ||  ||  ||  || 
|-
| 16 || April 17 || Guardians ||  ||  ||  ||  ||  ||  || 
|-
| 17 || April 18 || Guardians ||  ||  ||  ||  ||  ||  || 
|-
| 18 || April 19 || Guardians ||  ||  ||  ||  ||  ||  || 
|-
| 19 || April 21 || @ Orioles ||  ||  ||  ||  ||  ||  || 
|-
| 20 || April 22 || @ Orioles ||  ||  ||  ||  ||  ||  || 
|-
| 21 || April 23 || @ Orioles ||  ||  ||  ||  ||  ||  || 
|-
| 22 || April 24 || @ Brewers ||  ||  ||  ||  ||  ||  || 
|-
| 23 || April 25 || @ Brewers ||  ||  ||  ||  ||  ||  || 
|-
| 24 || April 26 || @ Brewers ||  ||  ||  ||  ||  ||  || 
|-
| 25 || April 27 || Orioles ||  ||  ||  ||  ||  ||  || 
|-
| 26 || April 28 || Orioles ||  ||  ||  ||  ||  ||  || 
|-
| 27 || April 29 || Orioles ||  ||  ||  ||  ||  ||  || 
|-
| 28 || April 30 || Orioles ||  ||  ||  ||  ||  ||  || 
|-

|-
| 29 || May 2 || Mets ||  ||  ||  ||  ||  ||  || 
|-
| 30 || May 3 || Mets ||  ||  ||  ||  ||  ||  || 
|-
| 31 || May 4 || Mets ||  ||  ||  ||  ||  ||  || 
|-
| 32 || May 5 || @ Cardinals ||  ||  ||  ||  ||  ||  || 
|-
| 33 || May 6 || @ Cardinals ||  ||  ||  ||  ||  ||  || 
|-
| 34 || May 7 || @ Cardinals ||  ||  ||  ||  ||  ||  || 
|-
| 35 || May 8 || @ Guardians ||  ||  ||  ||  ||  ||  || 
|-
| 36 || May 9 || @ Guardians ||  ||  ||  ||  ||  ||  || 
|-
| 37 || May 10 || @ Guardians ||  ||  ||  ||  ||  ||  || 
|-
| 38 || May 12 || Mariners ||  ||  ||  ||  ||  ||  || 
|-
| 39 || May 13 || Mariners ||  ||  ||  ||  ||  ||  || 
|-
| 40 || May 14 || Mariners ||  ||  ||  ||  ||  ||  || 
|-
| 41 || May 16 || Pirates ||  ||  ||  ||  ||  ||  || 
|-
| 42 || May 17 || Pirates ||  ||  ||  ||  ||  ||  || 
|-
| 43 || May 19 || @ Nationals ||  ||  ||  ||  ||  ||  || 
|-
| 44 || May 20 || @ Nationals ||  ||  ||  ||  ||  ||  || 
|-
| 45 || May 21 || @ Nationals ||  ||  ||  ||  ||  ||  || 
|-
| 46 || May 22 || @ Royals ||  ||  ||  ||  ||  ||  || 
|-
| 47 || May 23 || @ Royals ||  ||  ||  ||  ||  ||  || 
|-
| 48 || May 24 || @ Royals ||  ||  ||  ||  ||  ||  || 
|-
| 49 || May 25 || White Sox ||  ||  ||  ||  ||  ||  || 
|-
| 50 || May 26 || White Sox ||  ||  ||  ||  ||  ||  || 
|-
| 51 || May 27 || White Sox ||  ||  ||  ||  ||  ||  || 
|-
| 52 || May 28 || White Sox ||  ||  ||  ||  ||  ||  || 
|-
| 53 || May 29 || Rangers ||  ||  ||  ||  ||  ||  || 
|-
| 54 || May 30 || Rangers ||  ||  ||  ||  ||  ||  || 
|-
| 55 || May 31 || Rangers ||  ||  ||  ||  ||  ||  || 
|-

|-
| 56 || June 2 || @ White Sox ||  ||  ||  ||  ||  ||  || 
|-
| 57 || June 3 || @ White Sox ||  ||  ||  ||  ||  ||  || 
|-
| 58 || June 4 || @ White Sox ||  ||  ||  ||  ||  ||  || 
|-
| 59 || June 5 || @ Phillies ||  ||  ||  ||  ||  ||  || 
|-
| 60 || June 6 || @ Phillies ||  ||  ||  ||  ||  ||  || 
|-
| 61 || June 7 || @ Phillies ||  ||  ||  ||  ||  ||  || 
|-
| 62 || June 9 || Diamondbacks ||  ||  ||  ||  ||  ||  || 
|-
| 63 || June 10 || Diamondbacks ||  ||  ||  ||  ||  ||  || 
|-
| 64 || June 11 || Diamondbacks ||  ||  ||  ||  ||  ||  || 
|-
| 65 || June 12 || Braves ||  ||  ||  ||  ||  ||  || 
|-
| 66 || June 13 || Braves ||  ||  ||  ||  ||  ||  || 
|-
| 67 || June 14 || Braves ||  ||  ||  ||  ||  ||  || 
|-
| 68 || June 15 || @ Twins ||  ||  ||  ||  ||  ||  || 
|-
| 69 || June 16 || @ Twins ||  ||  ||  ||  ||  ||  || 
|-
| 70 || June 17 || @ Twins ||  ||  ||  ||  ||  ||  || 
|-
| 71 || June 18 || @ Twins ||  ||  ||  ||  ||  ||  || 
|-
| 72 || June 19 || Royals ||  ||  ||  ||  ||  ||  || 
|-
| 73 || June 20 || Royals ||  ||  ||  ||  ||  ||  || 
|-
| 74 || June 21 || Royals ||  ||  ||  ||  ||  ||  || 
|-
| 75 || June 23 || Twins ||  ||  ||  ||  ||  ||  || 
|-
| 76 || June 24 || Twins ||  ||  ||  ||  ||  ||  || 
|-
| 77 || June 25 || Twins ||  ||  ||  ||  ||  ||  || 
|-
| 78 || June 26 || @ Rangers ||  ||  ||  ||  ||  ||  || 
|-
| 79 || June 27 || @ Rangers ||  ||  ||  ||  ||  ||  || 
|-
| 80 || June 28 || @ Rangers ||  ||  ||  ||  ||  ||  || 
|-
| 81 || June 29 || @ Rangers ||  ||  ||  ||  ||  ||  || 
|-
| 82 || June 30 || @ Rockies ||  ||  ||  ||  ||  ||  || 
|-

|-
| 83 || July 1 || @ Rockies ||  ||  ||  ||  ||  ||  || 
|-
| 84 || July 2 || @ Rockies ||  ||  ||  ||  ||  ||  || 
|-
| 85 || July 4 || Athletics ||  ||  ||  ||  ||  ||  || 
|-
| 86 || July 5 || Athletics ||  ||  ||  ||  ||  ||  || 
|-
| 87 || July 6 || Athletics ||  ||  ||  ||  ||  ||  || 
|-
| 88 || July 7 || Blue Jays ||  ||  ||  ||  ||  ||  || 
|-
| 89 || July 8 || Blue Jays ||  ||  ||  ||  ||  ||  || 
|-
| 90 || July 9 || Blue Jays ||  ||  ||  ||  ||  ||  || 
|- style="text-align:center; background:#bbcaff;"
| colspan="10" | 2023 Major League Baseball All-Star Game
|-
| 91 || July 14 || @ Mariners ||  ||  ||  ||  ||  ||  || 
|-
| 92 || July 15 || @ Mariners ||  ||  ||  ||  ||  ||  || 
|-
| 93 || July 16 || @ Mariners ||  ||  ||  ||  ||  ||  || 
|-
| 94 || July 17 || @ Royals ||  ||  ||  ||  ||  ||  || 
|-
| 95 || July 18 || @ Royals ||  ||  ||  ||  ||  ||  || 
|-
| 96 || July 19 || @ Royals ||  ||  ||  ||  ||  ||  || 
|-
| 97 || July 20 || @ Royals ||  ||  ||  ||  ||  ||  || 
|-
| 98 || July 21 || Padres ||  ||  ||  ||  ||  ||  || 
|-
| 99 || July 22 || Padres ||  ||  ||  ||  ||  ||  || 
|-
| 100 || July 23 || Padres ||  ||  ||  ||  ||  ||  || 
|-
| 101 || July 25 || Angels ||  ||  ||  ||  ||  ||  || 
|-
| 102 || July 26 || Angels ||  ||  ||  ||  ||  ||  || 
|-
| 103 || July 27 || Angels ||  ||  ||  ||  ||  ||  || 
|-
| 104 || July 28 || @ Marlins ||  ||  ||  ||  ||  ||  || 
|-
| 105 || July 29 || @ Marlins ||  ||  ||  ||  ||  ||  || 
|-
| 106 || July 30 || @ Marlins ||  ||  ||  ||  ||  ||  || 
|-

|-
| 107 || August 1 || @ Pirates ||  ||  ||  ||  ||  ||  || 
|-
| 108 || August 2 || @ Pirates ||  ||  ||  ||  ||  ||  || 
|-
| 109 || August 4 || Rays ||  ||  ||  ||  ||  ||  || 
|-
| 110 || August 5 || Rays ||  ||  ||  ||  ||  ||  || 
|-
| 111 || August 6 || Rays ||  ||  ||  ||  ||  ||  || 
|-
| 112 || August 7 || Twins ||  ||  ||  ||  ||  ||  || 
|-
| 113 || August 8 || Twins ||  ||  ||  ||  ||  ||  || 
|-
| 114 || August 9 || Twins ||  ||  ||  ||  ||  ||  || 
|-
| 115 || August 10 || Twins ||  ||  ||  ||  ||  ||  || 
|-
| 116 || August 11 || @ Red Sox ||  ||  ||  ||  ||  ||  || 
|-
| 117 || August 12 || @ Red Sox ||  ||  ||  ||  ||  ||  || 
|-
| 118 || August 13 || @ Red Sox ||  ||  ||  ||  ||  ||  || 
|-
| 119 || August 15 || @ Twins ||  ||  ||  ||  ||  ||  || 
|-
| 120 || August 16 || @ Twins ||  ||  ||  ||  ||  ||  || 
|-
| 121 || August 17 || @ Guardians ||  ||  ||  ||  ||  ||  || 
|-
| 122 || August 18 || @ Guardians ||  ||  ||  ||  ||  ||  || 
|-
| 123 || August 19 || @ Guardians ||  ||  ||  ||  ||  ||  || 
|-
| 124 || August 20 || @ Guardians ||  ||  ||  ||  ||  ||  || 
|-
| 125 || August 21 || Cubs ||  ||  ||  ||  ||  ||  || 
|-
| 126 || August 22 || Cubs ||  ||  ||  ||  ||  ||  || 
|-
| 127 || August 23 || Cubs ||  ||  ||  ||  ||  ||  || 
|-
| 128 || August 25 || Astros ||  ||  ||  ||  ||  ||  || 
|-
| 129 || August 26 || Astros ||  ||  ||  ||  ||  ||  || 
|-
| 130 || August 27 || Astros ||  ||  ||  ||  ||  ||  || 
|-
| 131 || August 28 || Yankees ||  ||  ||  ||  ||  ||  || 
|-
| 132 || August 29 || Yankees ||  ||  ||  ||  ||  ||  || 
|-
| 133 || August 30 || Yankees ||  ||  ||  ||  ||  ||  || 
|-
| 134 || August 31 || Yankees ||  ||  ||  ||  ||  ||  || 
|-

|-
| 135 || September 1 || @ White Sox ||  ||  ||  ||  ||  ||  || 
|-
| 136 || September 2 || @ White Sox ||  ||  ||  ||  ||  ||  || 
|-
| 137 || September 3 || @ White Sox ||  ||  ||  ||  ||  ||  || 
|-
| 138 || September 5 || @ Yankees ||  ||  ||  ||  ||  ||  || 
|-
| 139 || September 6 || @ Yankees ||  ||  ||  ||  ||  ||  || 
|-
| 140 || September 7 || @ Yankees ||  ||  ||  ||  ||  ||  || 
|-
| 141 || September 8 || White Sox ||  ||  ||  ||  ||  ||  || 
|-
| 142 || September 9 || White Sox ||  ||  ||  ||  ||  ||  || 
|-
| 143 || September 10 || White Sox ||  ||  ||  ||  ||  ||  || 
|-
| 144 || September 12 || Reds ||  ||  ||  ||  ||  ||  || 
|-
| 145 || September 13 || Reds ||  ||  ||  ||  ||  ||  || 
|-
| 146 || September 14 || Reds ||  ||  ||  ||  ||  ||  || 
|-
| 147 || September 15 || @ Angels ||  ||  ||  ||  ||  ||  || 
|-
| 148 || September 16 || @ Angels ||  ||  ||  ||  ||  ||  || 
|-
| 149 || September 17 || @ Angels ||  ||  ||  ||  ||  ||  || 
|-
| 150 || September 18 || @ Dodgers ||  ||  ||  ||  ||  ||  || 
|-
| 151 || September 19 || @ Dodgers ||  ||  ||  ||  ||  ||  || 
|-
| 152 || September 20 || @ Dodgers ||  ||  ||  ||  ||  ||  || 
|-
| 153 || September 21 || @ Athletics ||  ||  ||  ||  ||  ||  || 
|-
| 154 || September 22 || @ Athletics ||  ||  ||  ||  ||  ||  || 
|-
| 155 || September 23 || @ Athletics ||  ||  ||  ||  ||  ||  || 
|-
| 156 || September 24 || @ Athletics ||  ||  ||  ||  ||  ||  || 
|-
| 157 || September 26 || Royals ||  ||  ||  ||  ||  ||  || 
|-
| 158 || September 27 || Royals ||  ||  ||  ||  ||  ||  || 
|-
| 159 || September 28 || Royals ||  ||  ||  ||  ||  ||  || 
|-
| 160 || September 29 || Guardians ||  ||  ||  ||  ||  ||  || 
|-
| 161 || September 30 || Guardians ||  ||  ||  ||  ||  ||  || 
|-
| 162 || October 1 || Guardians ||  ||  ||  ||  ||  ||  || 
|-

|- style="text-align:center;"
| Legend:       = Win       = Loss       = PostponementBold = Tigers team member

Current roster

Farm system

References

External links
Detroit Tigers official site

Detroit Tigers seasons
Detroit Tigers
Detroit Tigers